Klaus Wedemeier (born 12 January 1944 in Hof an der Saale) is a German politician (SPD) who served as the 5th President of the Senate and Mayor of Bremen from 1985 to 1995 and as the 47th President of the Bundesrat in 1993/94.

References

Mayors of Bremen
Members of the Bürgerschaft of Bremen
Presidents of the German Bundesrat
1944 births
Living people
Social Democratic Party of Germany politicians
People from Hof, Bavaria